The Gold Prix de la TNT (English: Gold TNT Award), nicknamed as Les Gold, is a French accolade bestowed in a ceremony by various telecom organizations partenant with Télé Star in recognition of excellence in programs and professionals of French and Francophone television. They are models as the Emmy Award equivalent.

The ceremony was preconceived to be the successor of the 7 d'Or (now discontinued) and become one of greatest in French television. The César Award for cinema, the Victoires de la Musique for music and the Molière Award for theater, can be considered as equivalent.

Organization 
The five nomination categories are voted by a jury of journalists and news editors of television, representing all French media: Europe 1, RTL, Public, Closer and Télé Star. The list of nominees is communicated May 11, at midnight. The official list of nominations for TNT's Gold Award is then posted on the site of the ceremony.

The first round of voting determines, in each category, emissions, Animators and columnists who received enough votes to enter the second round. The nominations are among 5 categories. The closing of the first round takes place five days before the press conference announces appointments. The second round determines, in each category, or the ones who, having obtained the highest number of votes will be awarded. The announcement of the winners takes place at the ceremony, June 9, in the presence of all named and many personalities of French television.

The closing of the second round takes place in online voting two days before the ceremony. The counting of votes in the second round is controlled and enclosed by the bailiff in his study, from 16h on the day of the ceremony. It then prepares secure envelopes containing the names of the winners of the 12 categories, and then affix his seal them. From that moment, he constantly keeps the 12 envelopes with him. He finally makes it to the place of the ceremony at 20h, and settled behind the scenes. The bailiff then hands personally and personally to each of remitters, as and extent of the advertisement trophies, the sealed envelope, which will then be opened on stage, live, by delivering and its contents revealed to the public.

Chamber and jury 
 Eric Pavon, Editor of Télé Star and Télé Poche 
 Gianni Lorenzon, Chief Editor of Public 
 Leslie Benaroch, journalist Public  Gaelle 
 Placek, Assistant Editor of VSD 
 Roman Ambro Europe 1 
 Thomas Joubert, Europe 1 
 Angevert Luc, Deputy Chief Editor of Closer 
 Vatant Kevin, Chief Editor of JeanMarcMorandini.fr 
 Nabet Ruth, Journalist

Competing television chains 

 D8 
 W9
 TMC
 NT1
NRJ 12
 France4

 D17
 gulli
 France Ô
 6ter
 Numéro 23
Chérie 25

Categories 

The Gold Prix de la TNT is awarded in the following categories:

 Outstanding show of Coaching
 Outstanding show of Talent
 Outstanding emission Surveys
 Outstanding  show of Televised Game
 Outstanding show Magazine/Documentary

 Outstanding Host/Moderator
 Outstanding Columnist
 Outstanding show of Reality TV
 Outstanding show of Entertainment
 Outstanding Novelty

 Gold of Honor

Ceremonies

Equivalents 

 Emmy Awards 

 César Award (cinema)
 Victoires de la Musique (music)
 Molière Award (theatre)

See also
 Golden Globe Awards
 BAFTA Television Awards
 Screen Actors Guild Awards
 Writers Guild of America Awards
 Critics’ Choice Television Awards
 Directors Guild of America Awards
 Producers Guild of America Awards
 Television Critics Association Awards

References & notes

External links
  

Television in France
Awards established in 2015
2015 establishments in France
Annual television shows
Film editing awards